Jan Lodewijk de Vries (born May 21, 1972 in Hellendoorn, Overijssel) is a retired water polo player from the Netherlands. He finished in ninth position with the Dutch team at the 1992 Summer Olympics in Barcelona.

References
 Dutch Olympic Committee

1972 births
Living people
People from Hellendoorn
Sportspeople from Overijssel
Dutch male water polo players
Olympic water polo players of the Netherlands
Water polo players at the 1992 Summer Olympics
20th-century Dutch people